is a town located in Myōzai District, Tokushima Prefecture, Japan.

Geography 
Ishii is located in northeastern Tokushima Prefecture on the island of Shikoku. On the north side of the town, the Yoshino River flows from east to west, and near the center of the town, the Iio River, which is a tributary of the Yoshino River, meanders. The land is almost all flat except for the mountains along the city-town border on the south side of the town.

Neighbouring municipalities 
Tokushima Prefecture
 Tokushima
 Yoshinogawa
 Kamiyama
 Itano
 Kamiita
 Aizumi

Climate
Ishii has a Humid subtropical climate (Köppen Cfa) characterized by warm summers and cool winters with light snowfall.  The average annual temperature in Ishii is 15.2 °C. The average annual rainfall is 2128 mm with September as the wettest month. The temperatures are highest on average in August, at around 26.4 °C, and lowest in January, at around 4.5 °C.

Demographics
Per Japanese census data, the population of Ishii has remained relatively stable for the past 60 years.

History 
As with all of Tokushima Prefecture, the area of Ishii was part of ancient Awa Province.  The village of Ishii was established within Myozai District, Tokushima with the creation of the modern municipalities system on October 1, 1889. It was raised to town status on November 1, 1907. Ishii annexed the neighboring villages of Urasho, Takahara, Aihata and Takagawara on March 31, 1955.

Government
Ishii has a mayor-council form of government with a directly elected mayor and a unicameral town council of 14 members. Itano, together with the other municipalities of Myozai District, contributes two members to the Tokushima Prefectural Assembly. In terms of national politics, the town is part of Tokushima 1st district of the lower house of the Diet of Japan.

Economy
Ishii has primarily an agricultural economy; however, due to its geographic proximity to Tokushima, it is increasingly becoming a commuter town. Nippon Ham and Morinaga Milk Industry are major employers.

Education
Ishii has six public elementary schools and two public middle schools operated by the town government and one public high school operated by the Tokushima Prefectural Department of Education. The Tokushima Prefectural College of Agriculture is located in Ishii.

Transportation

Railway 
 JR Shikoku - Tokushima Line
  -

Highways

Local attractions
Awa Kokubunni-ji ruins, National Historic Site
Dōgaku-ji

References

External links

Ishii official website 

Towns in Tokushima Prefecture
Ishii, Tokushima